Çiçekli is a village in Tarsus district  of Mersin Province, Turkey. It is situated in the Çukurova (Cilicia) plains. It is to the south of Yenice and the state highway . The population of the village  is 1270 as of 2011. Construction of the Çukurova Airport is planned near Çiçekli.

References

Villages in Tarsus District